Henk Nienhuis (11 August 1941 – 18 February 2017) was a Dutch footballer and manager. He spent the major part of his career at BV Veendam, hence his nickname Mister Veendam.

Playing career

Club
Nienhuis played in midfield for BV Veendam from 1963 to 1973, after joining them from hometown amateur side Nieuw Buinen. He made his debut for Veendam on 25 August 1963 against Excelsior.

He attracted interest from Feyenoord and was called up for Netherlands U-21 in November 1964, only for a severe injury to spoil his chances.

Managerial career
Nienhuis managed Veendam during the second half of the eighties, clinching promotion with them to the Eredivisie twice. He later worked as a director at the club, as he did at FC Groningen.

Personal life
He was honoured as a Knight of the Order of Orange-Nassau in 2000 for his services to football in the Netherlands. His son Evert-Jan also played for Veendam.

Nienhuis died in February 2017 of prostate cancer.

References

External links
 Obituaries - Mensenlinq
 Profile - Vliegende Keeper 

1941 births
2017 deaths
People from Borger-Odoorn
Dutch footballers
Association football midfielders
SC Veendam players
Eerste Divisie players
Dutch football managers
SC Veendam managers
Knights of the Order of Orange-Nassau
Deaths from prostate cancer
Deaths from cancer in the Netherlands
Footballers from Drenthe